The Singapore Democratic Party (SDP) is an opposition political party in Singapore. 

The party was founded on 6 August 1980 by Chiam See Tong. During the 1991 general election, Ling How Doong and Cheo Chai Chen won Bukit Gombak SMC and Nee Soon SMC respectively, giving the party a total of three seats in Parliament. When Chiam fell out with the party's Central Executive Committee in 1993 and subsequently left the party in 1996 for the splinter Singapore People's Party (SPP), the party became destabilised. Chiam was succeeded by Chee Soon Juan, who has remained as Secretary-General ever since.

A centrist to centre-left political party, the SDP ideologically draw upon both liberalism and social democracy. Different factions have dominated the party at different times, with the party goals being relatively distinct during the Chiam and Chee leadership. Members of the party have its own ideological bent, some leaning towards the centre-left and others the centre. Since the 2000s, the party has since focused more on a liberal human rights agenda. 

The party has called for a few reforms to the Constitution. Among others, it emphasises stronger protections for civil liberties and promotes social liberal approaches to issues as well as changes to education, healthcare and housing policies. It also favours more social welfare spending for Singaporeans and decreasing the rates of immigration. The party is both a member of Liberal International and the Council of Asian Liberals and Democrats.

History

Founding
The SDP was founded on 6 August 1980 by lawyer Chiam See Tong, who had contested several elections as an independent candidate in the 1970s, together with consultant engineer Fok Tai Loy and businessman Ernest Chew Tian Ern, who they took the roles of the party's founding Secretary-General, Chairman, and Assistant Secretary-General, respectively. The main objectives of the party were declared to be the "elimination of colonialism and feudalism, the safeguarding of parliamentary democracy and upholding of the principles of democracy, socialism and the constitution." Two months later, on 19 October 1980, the party unveiled its emblem: a circle (which symbolises unity amongst Singapore's ethnic groups), behind an arrow (representing political progress in Singapore) in the colour red (signifying courage and determination). The party was inaugurated on 21 September 1981, a full year after being registered as a political party.

Leadership under Chiam See Tong (1980–1993)

1980 and 1984 general elections

The party entered the election campaign of that year under the slogan of "Singaporeans for Singapore", raising the need for elected opposition in parliament to bring democracy to Singapore. The party also raised other prominent issues of the time such as the need to reform the education and CPF system, and its opposition to the Elected Presidency. It noticeably fielded only four candidates in that general election: Secretary-General Chiam See Tong, Chairman Ling How Doong (who was elected Chairman after the death of Fok Tai Loy), Vice-Chairman Soon Kia Seng and treasurer Peter Lim Ah Yong.

During the campaigning, the party came under fire from the ruling's People's Action Party (PAP), with Ling and Chiam bearing the brunt of the attacks. The PAP chose to highlight Ling's dismissal from the police force and the record of his election agent, but these were quickly rebutted by the SDP leadership. Chiam saw his secondary school record being brought up by the then-Prime Minister Lee Kuan Yew, who compared Chiam's intelligence with that of PAP's Mah Bow Tan (a candidate who later became a cabinet minister and then-MP of Tampines GRC) who was standing against the SDP leader. Chiam won the single seat of Potong Pasir after three attempts in the constituency by a vote of 60.3% to Mah's 39.7%, making Chiam as only the second opposition politician ever to be elected to the Republic's Parliament after J.B. Jeyaretnam of the Workers' Party. The SDP garnered 45.2% of total votes cast in the constituencies they had contested in.

After Jeyaretnam was expelled from Parliament in 1986, Chiam was Singapore's sole opposition MP. A moderate, Chiam claimed that he was not opposing for the sake of opposition. He also said: "But if they (the government) do the wrong things which are not good for Singapore, then we will oppose fearlessly".

1988 general elections

The 1988 general elections saw the opposition's strongest challenge since 1963, with 71 out of 82 seats contested. This election also saw the PAP engage the SDP's Chiam and WP's Jeyaretnam in a television debate. Besides Chiam and Ling, the SDP also fielded Ashleigh Seow (the son of former Solicitor-General Francis Seow), businessmen Jufrie Mahmood, Cheo Chai Chen and Ng Teck Siong, sales manager Kwan Yue Keng, bank clerical assistant Mohd Shariff Yahya, teacher George Sita, financial futures trader Jimmy Tan, former PAP MP Low Yong Nguan, businesswoman Toh Kim Kiat, construction supervisor Francis Yong Chu Leong, shipping manager Chia Ah Soon and director Sin Kek Tong, the later who would found Chiam's spin-off party of Singapore People's Party. The party chose to target the government on the plan to amend the constitution, and that the economic prosperity indicators it used were untrue When the results were declared, it emerged that the SDP was the only opposition party to win a seat, with Chiam re-elected as Potong Pasir MP for a second term. The SDP scored 39.5% of the total votes cast in all the constituencies it had contested in.

1991 general elections

The PAP's announcement of a general election in 1991 came when the ruling party was barely in office for three years. The SDP chose to highlight its objections to some controversial government policies such as the sharp increase of ministers' salaries, the cost of healthcare, university education, transport and the GST. Most significantly, the SDP engineered an agreement with the other opposition parties to contest just under half the seats in Parliament, thus creating a "by-election effect" (reassuring voters that there would not be a change in government and encouraging them to elect more opposition voices).

The election results saw SDP best performance for an opposition in post-independence Singapore since Barisan Sosialis with a combined vote share of 48.6%. All nine of the candidates put up extremely strong fights against the PAP during this election, with three candidates elected to the parliament (Leader Chiam, party Chairman Ling How Doong and Cheo Chai Chen of Potong Pasir SMC, Bukit Gombak SMC and Nee Soon Central SMC, respectively); While Ling and Cheo were elected in tight margins, Chiam's 69.6% was both himself and any opposition's best performance hitherto. Along with Worker's Party would-be leader Low Thia Khiang electing in Hougang, the opposition won a combined four parliament seats, then the largest representation since 1963. At the time, the result was viewed as being a notable setback to the ruling party and Prime Minister Goh Chok Tong.

In 1992, Chiam recruited Chee Soon Juan, a psychology lecturer at the National University of Singapore (NUS), to be an SDP candidate for a by-election in the Marine Parade Group Representation Constituency. Although the SDP was unsuccessful in the by-election (the PAP won 72.9% of the votes, the SDP 24.5%, and other smaller parties 2.6%), the recruitment of Chee as a candidate generated considerable public interest. However differences between Chiam, Chee and the rest of the party's Central Executive Committee were soon to emerge.

Internal party disputes in 1993
In 1993, three months after joining the SDP, Chee was dismissed by the NUS for allegedly using research funds to pay the courier fees (under $200) to send his wife's PhD dissertation to the United States, which Chee claimed that this was not the case as his wife was an employee in the same department at NUS at that time and was working with him, sharing and collaborating in their research, and that the funds were properly used. Chee claimed that there was a political motive behind his dismissal, but the PAP denied the accusation; Chiam wanted to censure Chee for his comments, but the party's Central Executive Committee (CEC) backed Chee.

Chiam then relinquished his party's Secretary-General post to Chee, before he proceed to publicly criticise the CEC, and won a court case to prevent the party from expelling Chiam (as well as vacating his Potong Pasir seat) from SDP on procedural grounds; however the CEC appointed Ling to replace Chiam as the party's parliamentary leader.

Supporters of Chiam left the SDP and formed the Singapore People's Party (SPP) in 1994, with former SDP member Sin Kek Tong as its pro-tem leader. After Parliament was dissolved ahead of the 1997 general election, Chiam left the SDP to join the SPP and became the new party's leader.

Leadership under Chee Soon Juan (since 1993)

1994–2000

After being placed as the acting SDP leader in 1993, Chee began expressing his views on the lack of democracy in Singapore to the media. He published his second political book, Dare To Change: An Alternative Vision for Singapore, in 1996. This view had since led to the attention of the PAP's Organizing Secretary Matthias Yao; ahead of the 1997 elections, Chee publicly issue a challenge to stand against Yao (who he accepted) in his constituency of MacPherson.

At the 1997 general election, the SDP suffered significant electoral setbacks with SDP failing to win a single seat since 1984, including incumbents Cheo and Ling, as well as Chee. Their party's vote also dropped from 48.6% down to 33.1%, and no SDP members until now have been elected since. However, former SDP Member Chiam, now a SPP candidate, succeed in retaining his Potong Pasir seat, alongs WP's Low in his Hougang ward; Chiam and Low were also the only opposition MPs returned to Parliament for two more elections (2001 and 2006).

In 1999, Chee came to national attention when he gave a public speech in the financial district despite being denied a permit to speak publicly.

2001–2005

During the campaigning, Chee's meeting with then-Prime Minister Goh Chok Tong sparked public's imagination during one of Goh's rallies where he, along with his followers, raised their fists and chanted slogans. Later, from his campaign vehicle, Chee used a megaphone to ask Goh: "Where is the S$18 billion that you have lent to (Indonesian President) Suharto?" PAP shortly demanded Chee to apologise for claiming a false accusation or face a defamation lawsuit. Despite apologising to PAP a day later due to the party's pressure, SDP further criticise the PAP's economic policies and urged for the minimum wage of S$5 per hour for the rest of the 2001 campaign. The SDP's economic alternatives were dismissed by the PAP which claimed that the SDP policies would lead Singapore to bankruptcy and inflation.

The party's popular vote fell for the second consecutive election, down to 20.4%, in addition on failing to win a seat for the parliament. Due to bankruptcy set forth by the PAP in the following year (which barred candidates from running in elections), this was Chee's last stint in the political arena until three elections later in 2015.

2006 general election

In March 2006, just before the 2006 general election, the party appeared to be cracking from within after Chee was jailed for not paying a fine for contempt of court. Then-SDP's chairman, Ling How Doong, was quoted as saying that the party "would be run even better" without Chee, citing that the party was not just a one-man show and could survive and even thrive without him. Chee's sister Chee Siok Chin. also a party member, confirmed that the party remained united.

The party continued its preparations for the 2006 general election, choosing to target then-Health Minister Khaw Boon Wan in Sembawang GRC over the National Kidney Foundation Scandal and to ride on the public backlash at the time. The party subsequently published an editorial in the New Democrat questioning the PAP's credibility over the issue, but PAP went to sue SDP for defamation on 22 April, and PAP won, resulting in the entire CEC (except for the Chee Siblings) to apologise and pay damages by 26 April.

Nevertheless, the party successfully nominate a combined seven candidates (Sembawang GRC and Bukit Panjang SMC) on nomination day, two days before being sued. The Sembawang team was led by Chee Siok Chin, along with businessmen Christopher Neo, Isa Abdul Aziz and Yong Chu Leong, marketing manager Gerald Sng Choon Guan and administrator Narayanasamy Gogelavany, while the party's chair, Ling How Doong, was fielded in Bukit Panjang SMC. The SDP's final vote share for Sembawang and Bukit Panjang was 23.3% and 22.8% respectively, marking a slight improvement in results as compared to 2001, but still far short of the national average of 33.3%.

Tak Boleh Tahan protest
On 15 March 2008, Chee and 18 others held a demonstration at Parliament House, all wearing red Tak Boleh Tahan (Cannot Take It) T-shirts to kick-start the campaign.  At Parliament House, the protesters were warned by police to stop their unlawful assembly.  When the warning was ignored, the police dispersed the protest and arrested the demonstrators.

The trial PP vs. Chee Soon Juan and 18 others began on October 23, 2008, with the defendants charged on two counts of violating Section 5(4)b Chapter 184 of the Miscellaneous Offences (Public and Nuisance) Act. In their defense, the "defendants claim that they're innocent by virtue of their right under the Singapore constitution to enjoy the guarantees of freedom of assembly and expression", and the trial has been described by the Washington Times as "a test about whether Singapore's judiciary is independent".

2011 general election

In preparation for the impending elections in 2011, the Singapore Democratic Party organized two pre-election rallies at Hong Lim Park on September and November 2010. The Party also unveiled a Shadow Budget in February 2011, as well as its campaign strategy, "The SDP Promise" in April 2011. Between September 2010 and April 2011, SDP also continued its groundwork in the constituencies of Bukit Panjang, Holland–Bukit Timah, Yuhua and Whampoa.

The party unveiled its slate of 11 candidates just a few days prior to Nomination Day. The candidates were introduced during press conferences on 21 and 22 April 2011. Former senior civil servant Tan Jee Say, private school teacher Michelle Lee Juen, psychiatrist Ang Yong Guan and social activist Vincent Wijeysingha made up the SDP's team for Holland–Bukit Timah GRC. Also announced during this period of time was the party's intention to contest Sembawang GRC. The team fielded there consisted of academic and former WP member James Gomez, party Assistant-Secretary General John Tan, entrepreneur Jarrod Luo, former unionist Sadasivam Veriyah and businessman Mohd Isa. Former ISA detainee Teo Soh Lung and party treasurer Gerald Sng were also introduced to the media and were fielded in the constituencies of Yuhua and Bukit Panjang respectively. The party later recruited Alec Tok, leaving Sng to make way for Tok in Bukit Panjang SMC.

Among the issues brought up by the party prior to nomination day were: the heavy influx of foreigners into Singapore, Vivian Balakrishnan's mismanagement of the Youth Olympic Games and the loss of sinking funds in the PAP run town councils in Holland–Bukit Timah and Bukit Panjang. However, these issues were quickly overshadowed by Balakrishnan's attack on the SDP team over a video supposedly containing Wijeysingha's "gay agenda". The SDP quickly refuted these allegations on Wijeysingha, with the party's Secretary-General making his stance clear on a video released by the party on 25 April. On nomination day, the Singapore Democratic Party team saw the nomination of all its candidates. In particular, the Holland–Bukit Timah team had also raised an objection to the nomination of the PAP's candidates. The PAP's Sim Ann had filed in her occupation as a former civil servant and this was disputed by the SDP team given the short time span between Sim Ann's resignation from the civil service and nomination day.

On the polling day on 7 May, the SDP was defeated in all the seats they contested, with 36.1%, 33.73%, 33.14% for Sembawang GRC, Bukit Panjang SMC and Yuhua SMC, respectively; however, their team in Holland–Bukit Timah GRC scored its best result since 1997, with 39.92% (slightly above the national average of 39.86%), and the party's scored 36.76% of the party's popular vote.

After the election, Tan Jee Say resigned from SDP to seek candidacy for the presidential election held on the same year, as constitution states that candidates were required to be nonpartisan and cannot represent in any political party. Despite receiving endorsement from the oppositions, Tan only garnered 529,732 out of over two million valid votes (or 25.04%) and finished third in a rare four-cornered contest to Tony Tan (a former PAP member and Deputy Prime Minister), where he won the election with 744,397 votes (or 35.20%).

On 23 November 2012, secretary-general Chee was formally discharged from bankruptcy in court, allowing him to participate in future elections once more. Chee initially expressed his intention to contest the Punggol East SMC in the 2013 by-election (which was precipitated after the incumbent MP Michael Palmer resigned due to an extramarital affair), which could have marked his return to the political arena after a decade, but later pulled out from contest to avoid a multi-cornered contest and backed WP (whose candidate, Lee Li Lian, would later go on to win).

2015 general election

Elections were called by Prime Minister Lee Hsien Loong in 2015 commemorating after 50 years of independence. The SDP contested five electoral divisions, which were Bukit Batok SMC, Bukit Panjang SMC, Yuhua SMC, Holland-Bukit Timah GRC and Marsiling-Yew Tee GRC. For the SDP, the election saw the return to the politics for Secretary-General Chee since 2001 after Chee was discharged from bankruptcy, who led his team to contest Holland–Bukit Timah GRC (along with Paul Tambyah, a professor, Sidek Mallek, a compliance auditor, and Chong Wai Fung, a medical administrator). Despite failing to win any contested seat, Chee's team of Holland–Bukit Timah GRC polled above the Opposition's national average with 30.14% of the popular vote. All the candidates who contested this ward in the 2011 elections such as Vincent Wijeysingha, Tan Jee Say and Ang Yong Guan, resigned from the party prior; Tan and Ang would later become members to lead Singaporeans First.

In this electoral contest, Chee was noted for shifting away from a confrontational style of politics in an attempt to soften his image. Whether this was successful is debatable though it is commonly argued that Chee's return was a significant asset to the party. Although SDP's combined vote of 31.2% was lower compared to the previous election, this was against the backdrop of a large swing away from opposition parties, of which SDP was one of the least affected.

2016 Bukit Batok by-election

On 20 March 2016, SDP announced that Chee would stood as a candidate for the forthcoming by-election for the ward of Bukit Batok SMC held on 7 May, after incumbent David Ong vacated his seat due to an extramarital affair involving another grassroots leader. During nomination day on 27 April, Chee was successfully nominated and faced the PAP's new candidate Murali Pillai (who previously contested the WP-held Aljunied GRC). Former SDP member Kwan Yue Keng also stated his intention to contest as independent, but later withdrew upon Chee's successful nomination, as part of an agreement from the People's Power Party to prevent a walkover.

Despite the by-election defeat, an 11.78% swing towards SDP from the last election saw Chee's best performance score since 1997, at 38.79%. His best performance was widely attributed on his opinionated personality rather than introspective, and how his campaign drew notable attention to his supporters.

2017–2018: Lawsuit regarding by-elections
On 7 August 2017, former Parliamentary Speaker Halimah Yacob vacated her seat in Marsiling-Yew Tee GRC in order to contest that year's presidential election. While the seat remain vacant, the grassroots advisor (which was linked to People's Association) was replaced by Chua Chu Kang GRC MP Zaqy Mohamad the day after. Despite Mohamad was a minority MP for the GRC and a grassroots advisor is not the same as having an MP elected by residents of the constituency, one of the original purposes of the GRC system was to ensure minority representation, and thus a by-election was not held.

On 14 September (the same day Yacob was sworn as president after the election went uncontested), the party's assistant treasurer Wong Souk Yee filed a lawsuit for a by-election (intended to occur on 15 January 2018 as cited in a pre-trial conference) to be called. Justice Chua Lee Ming presided on the hearing, but on 9 April 2018, their bid was dismissed and Wong was tasked to pay S$10,764.35; Chua told that a by-election should be called only when all seats in a GRC are vacated (which was did once on the 1992 Marine Parade by-election), and there is no legal basis to ask the three remaining MPs to resign.

On 16 January 2019, Wong called on the apex court to issue a mandatory order to compel its three MPs to step down for a two-hour hearing.

2018–2020: Preparing for the 2020 general election

In July 2018, SDP was among the six other opposition parties (the others were Reform Party, Singaporeans First, People's Power Party, Democratic Progressive Party, National Solidarity Party, and a new party formed by former NSP chief Lim Tean, People's Voice Party) present in a meeting led by former PAP MP Tan Cheng Bock, on the possibility of forming a collation for the next election with Tan as the party leader. SDP intend to side WP as stated after the 2015 elections, but the latter declined their participation request, and did not turn up on the party's meeting.

On 23 February 2019, at the time the impending election was yet to be announced, the party was the first to begin their election campaign despite a last-minute venue dropout, and announced that they would contest the same constituencies as they did in the 2015 election, and a goal to prevent the ruling PAP from retaining a government with a supermajority (two-thirds of the total number of parliamentary seats) that the party attained since post-independence. Party's vice-chairman John Tan announced that SDP would also unveil policy papers on housing and the cost of living the following month, followed by healthcare and population issues in May. Former DPP secretary-leader Benjamin Pwee, on the same time, was revealed that he and a few others have submitted their applications to join the SDP, after Pwee left the party on 19 February.

On 21 June, the party's leader confirmed Chee would settle a rematch in the Bukit Batok SMC against Murali in the election. Three days later on the 24th, the party confirmed their intentions to contest the same wards that they challenged in the last election, namely Bukit Panjang, Holland–Bukit Timah, Marsiling–Yew Tee and Yuhua. Their nominations were confirmed on 30 June, resulting in 11 candidates competing in the election, among which three candidates made their election debut, and Tan Jee Say returning to the party after earlier dissolving Singaporean First ahead of the nominations.

SDP chairman and Bukit Panjang candidate Paul Tambyah on 3 July had said the Ministry of Manpower (MOM) had told "employers they were not allowed to bring their workers for testing", an allegation that Minister for National Development Lawrence Wong later denied on 5 July.

When the results was announced on 10 July, they were defeated in every seats contested, although Bukit Panjang came that close to winning the election with chairman Tambyah garnering 46.26% of the votes, while Chee came second with 45.20% of the votes while contesting Bukit Batok. Their vote share based on the constituencies contested was 37.04%, falling short from the national average of 38.76%.

Organisation and structure
The SDP is governed by a twelve-member Central Executive Committee (CEC), who are elected by the party's cadre members at the Ordinary Party Conference held biennially.

Leadership

List of secretaries-general

List of chairmen

Former elected Members of Parliament

Electoral history

Parliamentary by-election results

Affiliations
The affiliates with which the SDP works in co-operation are:
 Alliance for Reform and Democracy in Asia
 World Movement for Democracy
 Sweden-Singapore Initiative for Democracy
 Community of Democracies NGO Process

The Young Democrats (the SDP's youth wing) is a member of:
 International Federation of Liberal Youth (IFLRY)
 Young Liberals and Democrats of Asia (YLDA)

References

Bibliography

Mutalib, Hussin. 2004. Parties and Politics: A Study of Opposition Parties and the PAP in Singapore. (2nd ed.) Singapore: Marshall Cavendish Academic.

External links
 
Press release on podcast

Political parties in Singapore
Liberal parties in Singapore
1980 establishments in Singapore
Political parties established in 1980